Primal Rock Rebellion are a heavy metal band from London, England, consisting of Adrian Smith (Iron Maiden) and Mikee Goodman (SikTh). The band's debut album, Awoken Broken, was released on 27 February 2012, with one song, "I See Lights", released as a free download on the project's official website on 2 January. On 26 January 2012, the music video for "No Place Like Home" was released on the band's website along with the announcement that it will be the album's first single.

Discography
Studio albums
 Awoken Broken (2012)

Personnel
Mikee Goodman – lead vocals
Adrian Smith – guitar, bass guitar, vocals

Session musicians
Dan Foord – drums

References

External links
Official website

Musical groups established in 2011
English heavy metal musical groups
English progressive metal musical groups
Avant-garde metal musical groups
Heavy metal duos
Bieler Bros. Records artists
Mathcore musical groups
2011 establishments in England